Łomża Voivodeship was an administrative division and local government in Poland in the years 1975 to 1998, superseded by the Podlaskie Voivodeship.

Its capital city was Łomża.

Cities and towns
Major cities and towns (population in 1998):
 Łomża – 64,605 (1995 – 63,000)
 Zambrów – 23,879 (1995 – 23,600)
 Grajewo – 22,966 (1995 – 22,400)
 Kolno – 11,180

Population
1975 – 320,200
1980 – 325,800
1985 – 338,700
1990 – 346,700
1995 – 353,800
1998 – 352,900

References

Voivodeship
Former voivodeships of Poland (1975–1998)
History of Masovian Voivodeship